Samuel Andrés Vargas Ariza (born 12 April 1989) is a Canadian-Colombian professional boxer.

Professional career
Vargas turned professional in 2010 at the age of 20, scoring a technical knockout (TKO) victory against Todd Furler in Montreal, Quebec.

He won the NCC Welterweight championship by defeating Manolis Plaitis in 2012.

In 2013 he received NABA Canada super welterweight title after a TKO victory against Julius Bunda in Toronto, Ontario

On 13 October 2016, it was announced that Vargas would face off against WBC welterweight champion Danny García at the Liacouras Center on 12 November. It was said that the fight would be a non-title ten-round fight. Vargas lost via TKO in the seventh round.

On 25 July 2020, Vargas was the first boxer to go more than six rounds with undefeated prospect Vergil Ortiz Jr, losing by TKO in the seventh round.

Vargas' next fight would be against undefeated Conor Benn in the Copper Box Arena in London on 10 April 2021. The fight lasted just 80 seconds, as Benn landed two right-left combinations which rocked Vargas, followed by a barrage of punches and a hard uppercut on the ropes that saw the bout stopped, resulting in Vargas' seventh professional loss. On March 13, 2022, Vargas announced his retirement from boxing.

Personal life
Vargas currently resides in Toronto, Ontario.

Championships and accomplishments
National Championship of Canada
NCC Welterweight Championship (One time)
World Boxing Association/North American Boxing Association
WBA-NABA Welterweight Championship (One time)
Interim WBA-NABA Welterweight Championship (One time)
WBA-NABA Canada Super Welterweight Championship (One time)

Professional boxing record

References

External links

1989 births
Living people
Welterweight boxers
Light-middleweight boxers
Canadian male boxers
Colombian male boxers
Sportspeople from Bogotá